Aglaia macrocarpa is a species of plant in the family Meliaceae. It is found in Brunei, Indonesia, Malaysia, Singapore, Thailand, Vietnam, and possibly the Philippines.

References

macrocarpa
Near threatened plants
Taxonomy articles created by Polbot